Linari is an Italian surname. Notable people with the surname include:

Elena Linari (born 1994), Italian women's footballer
Fred Linari (born 1921), American basketball player
Nancy Linari, American voice actress
Pietro Linari (1896–1972), Italian cyclist

Italian-language surnames